Trevor Alfred Housley  (31 October 191010 October 1968) was a senior Australian public servant. He was Director-General of the Postmaster-General's Department from 1965 until his death in October 1968.

Life and career
Trevor Housley was born on 31 October 1910 in Gympie, Queensland.

Housley served for four years as chief airways engineer in the Department of Civil Aviation, until 1951 when he joined the Overseas Telecommunications Commission (OTC) as assistant general manager. In 1956, he was appointed to OTC general manager. In the general manager role, Housley led a delegation to the Commonwealth Telecommunications Conference in 1958 which recommended a worldwide telephone cable system be developed. He returned to London in 1960 to convene a management committee responsible for plans to lay the British Commonwealth trans-Pacific cable between Australia and New Zealand.

Housley was appointed Director-General of Posts and Telegraphs, heading the Postmaster-General's Department, in 1965.

In 1967, he penned Communications in Modern Society, in which he argued that if public administrators could shift from paper communication to phone-calls, it would streamline the service and enable "quickly responsive sensitivity to public need".

At Kew, Melbourne on 10 October 1968, while still in office as Director-General of the Postmaster-General's Department, Housley died of an intracranial haemorrhage.

Awards and honours
1961, Housley was appointed a Commander of the Order of the British Empire.

In 2012, a street in the Canberra suburb of Casey was named Housley Street in Trevor Housley's honour.

References

1910 births
1968 deaths
Australian public servants
Australian Commanders of the Order of the British Empire
People from Gympie